Concours de Dressage International (CDI) is the competition rating for international dressage events. The rating is given by the equestrian governing body FEI.

A CDI is divided from one to five stars. The height of the star depends on the class in which the rider competes and the prize money.

CDI5*: Big Tour (Minimum of prizemoney €72'200, no maximum)
CDI4*: Big Tour (Minimum of prizemoney €19'200 and maximum of prizemoney €71'099)
CDI3*: Big Tour (Maximum of prizemoney €19'199, no minimum)
CDI2*: Medium Tour (No minimum nor maximum prizemoney)
CDI1*: Small Tour (No minimum nor maximum prizemoney)

To be able to organize a CDI5* you must first have organized a CDI4*. Only when a positive report has been released on the CDI4* by the Foreign Judge can a CDI5* be organized.

Other sections
CDI-W: International World Cup competition or a WC qualifier in Grand Prix. 
CDIAm: International amateurs class 
CDIYH: International Young Horse class divided into 5 years old, 6 years old, and 7 years old horses.
CDIU25: An international class for Grand Prix riders under the age of 25
CDIY: An international class for Young Riders between the age of 18 and 21 
CDIJ: An international class for Juniors between the age of 16 and 18 
CDICh-A/B: An international class for Children between the age of 12 and 14 in which the rider can decide to ride on E-ponies and horses. This class is for children who already want to start in a horse division class. 
CDIP: An international class for Pony riders between the age of 12 and 16

Nations Cup
A CDI can also be organized as a Nations Cup, well known as a Concours de Dressage International Officiele (CDIO). The CDIO rating is divided between a CDIO2*, CDIO3*, CDIO4*, and CDIO5*. There are currently eight Nations Cup competitions:

Former Dressage Nations Cup shows

In the youth classes, there is also a Nations Cup. This exists of the CDIOU25, CDIOY, CDIOJ, CDIOP, and CDIOCh.

Prestigious shows
There are several major competitions that have the prestigious 5 * status. The best riders and horses come together at these competitions.

Shows as Aachen, München-Riem and Frankfurt (Germany), Rotterdam (Netherlands), Falsterbo (Sweden), Doha (Qatar), Herning (Denmark), Wellington (USA), Geneva (Switzerland) and Compiegne (France) are prestigious CDI5* shows.

References

External links
FEI Dressage tests

Dressage events
International Federation for Equestrian Sports